Machay (possibly from Quechua for cave) is a mountain in the Andes of Peru which reaches a height of approximately . It is located in the Huánuco Region, Huánuco Province, Churubamba District.

References

Mountains of Peru
Mountains of Huánuco Region